The Order of Suvorov is a military decoration of the Russian Federation named in honor of Russian Generalissimo Prince Alexander Suvorov (1729–1800).

History 
The Order of Suvorov was originally a Soviet award established on July 29, 1942 (during World War II) by decision of the Presidium of Supreme Soviet of the USSR.  It was created to reward senior army personnel for exceptional leadership in combat operations. The Order of Suvorov was divided into three different classes: 1st class, 2nd class, and 3rd class. Georgi Zhukov became the first recipient of the Order of Suvorov 1st class on January 28, 1943.

The Order 1st class was awarded to army commanders for exceptional leadership of combat operations. The Order 2nd class was awarded to corps, division, and brigade commanders for a decisive victory over a numerically superior enemy. The Order 3rd class was awarded to regimental commanders, their chiefs of staff, and battalion and company commanders for outstanding leadership leading to a combat victory. Despite its official award criteria, both the first and second classes of the Order were sometimes awarded to defense industry executives, as well as to designers of various weapons and military equipment. Only a dozen non-Russians have received the Order 1st class, including World War II military leaders like United States Army Generals George C. Marshall and Dwight D. Eisenhower, British Army Field Marshal Alan Brooke, 1st Viscount Alanbrooke and Royal Navy Admiral Sir Robert Burnett.

Following the 1991 dissolution of the USSR, the Order of Suvorov was retained unchanged by Decision of the Supreme Soviet of the Russian Federation 2557-I of March 20, 1992 but it was not awarded in this form.  The all encompassing Presidential Decree 1099 of September 7, 2010 that modernised and reorganised the entire Russian awards system away from its Soviet past changed the statute of the Order to a single-class medal.

In November 2015 all recipient formations in the Armed Forces of Ukraine were stripped of their Order of Suvorov honors as part of the removal of Soviet-era awards under decommunization.

Award statute 

The Order of Suvorov is awarded in a single class to formation commanders, their deputies, heads of operational management, of operational departments, chiefs of the army and of special forces of the Armed Forces of the Russian Federation: for skilful organization of the operations and management of groups of troops (forces), formations and military units, who managed, despite the stubborn resistance of the enemy, its numerical superiority, better technical equipment and a more favourable location in the theatre of operations to achieve the goals of the operation to keep key areas of its territory (or territory of allied countries), to create conditions for seizing the initiative and conduct further operations with offensive purposes; for skilful organization and management of units of the Armed Forces of the Russian Federation during events of strategic deterrence, to ensure that no escalation, aggression (conflict) against the Russian Federation and (or) its allies occurs.

May also be awarded for conducting operations on land or in the air, during which, despite the numerical superiority of the enemy, the objectives of the operations were carried out while retaining the full operational capability of military units. May be awarded to foreign citizens – soldiers of allied forces from among the senior officers involved alongside the soldiers of the Russian Federation for organizing and conducting a successful combined operation of allied troops (forces).  The Order may be awarded posthumously.

Award description 
The Order of Suvorov is a 40mm wide gold plated cross pattée with silver rays protruding from the center outwards between the arms of the cross to form a square.  The distance from the tip of the silver rays to the tip of the opposite rays is 35mm.  The obverse center has a circular convex medallion bearing the gilded bust of Alexander Suvorov, in profile, facing left.  Just below the bust of Suvorov, on the medallion lower edge, crossed branches of oak and laurel.  At the upper part of the medallion, following its circumference, the inscription in red enamelled embossed letters "ALEXANDER SUVOROV" (in Russian: АЛЕКСАНДР СУВОРОВ).  The reverse is bare except for the award serial number.

The Order is suspended by a ring through the award's suspension loop to a standard Russian pentagonal mount covered by a 24mm wide green silk moiré ribbon with a 5mm wide orange central stripe.

The Russian Federation order of precedence dictates that the Order of Suvorov is to be worn on the left side of the chest, and in the presence of other orders of the Russian Federation, is to be located immediately after the Order of Alexander Nevsky.

See also

Awards and decorations of the Russian Federation
Awards and decorations of the Soviet Union
Field Marshal Count Alexander Suvorov

References

External links
 Указ Президиума Верховного Совета СССР «Об учреждении военных орденов: Ордена Суворова, первой, второй и третьей степени, Ордена Кутузова, первой и второй степени и Ордена Александра Невского» от 20 июля 1942 года // Ведомости Верховного Совета Союза Советских Социалистических Республик : газета. — 1942. — 5 августа (№ 30 (189)). — С. 1.
The Commission on State Awards to the President of the Russian Federation
Legal Library of the USSR

Awards established in 1942
Military awards and decorations of the Soviet Union
Military awards and decorations of Russia
1942 establishments in the Soviet Union
Alexander Suvorov